Araguanã is a municipality located in the Brazilian state of Tocantins. Its population was 5,793 (2020) and its area is 836 km².

The municipality contains 1.28% of the  Lago de Santa Isabel Environmental Protection Area, created in 2002.

References

Municipalities in Tocantins